Matthew John Kinney (born December 16, 1976) is an American former professional baseball pitcher. He spent  with the Saitama Seibu Lions of the Nippon Professional Baseball (MLB). Kinney is a graduate of Bangor High School.  Kinney and his Little League team was featured in the Stephen King essay "Head Down", featured in King's Nightmares and Dreamscapes collection.
He now resides in Maine with his wife Megan and sons Maddox Kinney and Mason Kinney.

Career
Kinney was drafted out of Bangor High School in the sixth round of the 1995 amateur draft by the Boston Red Sox. He was traded to the Minnesota Twins along with John Barnes for Orlando Merced and Greg Swindell in July 1998. In , he had just a 4.64 ERA with the Minnesota Twins, but went 2-7 that year. He was traded in the 2002 off-season to the Milwaukee Brewers. On August 6, 2004, Kinney was designated for assignment by the Brewers and was claimed off waivers by the Kansas City Royals. He made 11 relief appearances with the Royals that season. During the 2007- offseason, Kinney signed with the Saitama Seibu Lions, playing in Japan for a single season. Kinney returned to the United States in 2009 to play with the Fresno Grizzlies, the AAA affiliate of the San Francisco Giants.

Kinney gave up Barry Bonds' 660th home run, which tied Bonds with his godfather Willie Mays.

On August 24, 2010, while with the Triple-A Fresno Grizzlies of the Pacific Coast League, Kinney received a 50-game suspension after testing positive for an amphetamine, a banned performance-enhancing substance. Kinney took responsibility for the suspension but explained that the amphetamine in question was contained in Adderall, a drug he has been taking since 2005 to treat his attention deficit hyperactivity disorder, and was taken for medical reasons, not to boost his on-field performance. The suspension came as a result of his forgetting to file the proper paperwork with Major League Baseball when he signed with the Giants earlier in the year.

References

External links

1976 births
Living people
American expatriate baseball players in Canada
American expatriate baseball players in Japan
American disabled sportspeople
American sportspeople in doping cases
Baseball players from Maine
Baseball players suspended for drug offenses
Baseball players with disabilities
Edmonton Trappers players
Fort Myers Miracle players
Fresno Grizzlies players
Gulf Coast Red Sox players
Gulf Coast Twins players
Kansas City Royals players
Lowell Spinners players
Major League Baseball pitchers
Michigan Battle Cats players
Milwaukee Brewers players
Minnesota Twins players
New Britain Rock Cats players
Nippon Professional Baseball pitchers
Saitama Seibu Lions players
Salt Lake Buzz players
San Francisco Giants players
San Jose Giants players
Sarasota Red Sox players
Sportspeople from Bangor, Maine